"You're Not Alone" is a song by American electronica project Owl City. The song features American vocalist and songwriter Britt Nicole. It was released on October 7, 2014 as a promotional single from his fifth studio album, Mobile Orchestra.

Background
Owl City announced the release date of the song on September 29, 2014 along with another track, "Tokyo". Young stated that the song is about "being alone in a crowd" and that the message is how "we've all been there and you're not the only person to go through that." A lyrics video for the track was released on October 8, 2014.

Composition
Written and produced by Young, the track runs at 84 BPM and is in the key of D-sharp major. Young's range in the song spans from the notes Eb3 to C5. According to an interview with Power 88 FM radio, the song was inspired after Young read a news report online about a Sudanese woman, who was sentenced to death for her Christian beliefs, but was later rescued. Speaking about working with Britt Nicole on the song, he stated;

Critical reception

Tony Cummings of Cross Rhythms gave a positive review for the song. He called the collaboration "a brilliant idea" and the track the "perfect pop single." He remarked, "The duo have come up with one of the prettiest mid-tempo tracks."

Personnel

Owl City
Adam Young – vocals

Additional musicians
Britt Nicole – additional vocals, featured artist
Bryan Fowler – guitar
Jasper Nephew – guitar

Production
Joshua Crosby – vocal producer
Bryan Fowler – assistant mixing engineer
Ted Jensen – mastering engineer
Jerrico Scroggins – assistant mixing engineer
Christopher Stevens – mixing, programming

Charts

Weekly charts

Year-end charts

References

2014 songs
Owl City songs